Born Gangstaz is the only studio album by gangsta rapper Boss. It released on May 25, 1993, on Def Jam Recordings' West Coast-based sub-label DJ West, and was produced in part by Def Jef, Erick Sermon, Chyskillz, Jam Master Jay, and T-Ray. The album features guest appearances from rappers Erick Sermon, AMG and group Onyx, as well as dancehall performers Papa Juggy and Admiral D.

Born Gangstaz was a success, peaking at #22 on the Billboard 200 and #3 on the Top R&B/Hip-Hop Albums. The album features two the Billboard singles: "Deeper" and "Recipe of a Hoe". Both singles topping the Hot Rap Singles chart. "I Don't Give A Fuck" / "Mai Sista Izza Bitch" and "Progress of Elimination" also were released as singles.

Despite the success of this album, Boss has yet to release another album. According to Nielsen SoundScan, Born Gangstaz has sold 478,000 copies to date. The working title of the album was They Don't Have the Body Count.

Retrospect

Track listing

Credits

Executive producers: Russell Simmons, Courtney Branch, Tracy Kendrick, Greg Jessie, Tracey Waples

Charts

Singles

[A] Number 18 on the Bubbling Under Hot 100 Singles chart.

Songs in soundtracks
The song "I Don't Give A Fuck" featured during the closing credits of the episode "Lesbian Request Denied" from Season 1 of the Netflix TV show Orange Is the New Black.

References

External links 
 Born Gangstaz at Discogs
 Born Gangstaz at RapGenius
 
 
 

1993 debut albums
Boss (rapper) albums
Def Jam Recordings albums
Albums produced by Courtney Branch
Albums recorded at Chung King Studios
Albums recorded at Westlake Recording Studios